Qelëz is a village and a former municipality in the Shkodër County, northern Albania. At the 2015 local government reform it became a subdivision of the municipality Pukë. The population at the 2011 census was 1,761.

The municipality of Qelëz includes the following nine villages:

Qelëz
Fushë Bushat
Dushnezë
Midhe
Buzhalë
Dadaj
Lëvrushk
Ukth
Qerret i Vogël

References

Administrative units of Pukë
Former municipalities in Shkodër County
Villages in Shkodër County